is a Japanese film and stage director.

Biography
Shutaro Oku was born in 1975 in Tokyo, Japan. From 2000 to 2009, Oku directed many theatrical films, notably The Labor Cop, Japanese Naked Tribe, Aka-sen, Cain's Descendant, and USB. He also participated stage productions as visual planner, like Elisabeth and MOZART! for TOHO Musical, The Bee and Egg for NODA MAP productions, 1789, Casablanca for the Takarazuka Revue, and more.

In 2015, Oku directed the stage play based on 2011 anime series Blood-C, titled Blood-C: The Last Mind. That same year, he directed the stage play of Ghost in the Shell, titled Ghost in the Shell: Ghost is Alive.

In 2017, Oku directed the first live-action film adaptation for Blood-C, titled Asura Girl: Blood-C Another Story. Oku later returned to direct the two live-action films for Blood-C, Blood-Club Dolls 1 and Blood-Club Dolls 2. He also co-wrote the screenplay with Junichi Fujisaku.

In November 2019, Oku directed Battles Without Honor and Humanity: On'na-tachi no Shitō-hen, a stage adaptation of the Battles Without Honor and Humanity yakuza film series starring members of the female pop idol group AKB48.

Works

Film

Stage

References

External links
 
 

Japanese film directors
Living people
1975 births
People from Tokyo